The fourth season of Packed to the Rafters, an Australian drama television series, began on 8 February 2011 on the Seven Network. The season concluded on 20 March 2012 after 22 episodes.

Season four traces the family's fortunes as they attempt to rebuild their lives in the aftermath of Melissa's death. Strong family bonds ensure that traumatised Ben receives warm support as he takes his first steps back into the work-force. Slowly he learns to smile again, embracing a newfound interest in gardening and a growing friendship with his boss's daughter Emma, which might hold the promise of something more. There are further love issues in the Karandonis household, with Carbo and Retta choosing to elope rather than face the comic extravagance of a Karandonis wedding. Julie and Dave, meanwhile, are forced to deal with the consequences for Rachel and Jake of a dangerous accusation flung at him by a drunken woman on a rugby weekend away. Rachel's feelings for Jake are tested to the limit, especially when her boss throws into the confusing mix the chance of a lifetime to work in New York. The Rafters also wrestle with the unexpected arrival of new family members, not the least being the release from prison of Dave's father, Tom. Tom's never quite predictable manipulations ultimately force Dave to take a heart-breaking stand, and cause him to initially misjudge the intentions of his half-brother, Matt. Julie meanwhile finds a new best friend in Donna, though their initial exchanges are hilariously unpromising. Meanwhile, Nathan is searching for new direction in his life and his desire to travel forces Julie and Dave to undertake some soul-searching of their own. Ted is also keen to find a greater purpose, mentoring a troubled twelve-year-old boy.

Cast

Regular
 Rebecca Gibney as Julie Rafter
 Erik Thomson as Dave Rafter
 Angus McLaren as Nathan Rafter
 Hugh Sheridan as Ben Rafter
 George Houvardas as Carbo Karandonis
 James Stewart as Jake Barton
 Michael Caton as Ted Taylor
 Jessica Marais as Rachel Rafter (episodes 1–7)
 Ryan Corr as Coby Jennings (episodes 5–22)

Featuring
 John Howard as Tom Jennings

Recurring and guest
 Hannah Marshall as Retta Schembri
 Dina Panozzo as Rita Karandonis
Hannah & Sabella Storey as Ruby Rafter
 Martin Lynes as Paul Morgan
 Diarmid Heidenreich as Camel
 Torquil Neilson as Hamish
 Sarah Snook as Jodi Webb
 Annette Shun Wah as Mai
Merridy Eastman as Donna Mackey
 Kristian Schmid as Alex Barton
 Camille Keenan as Bree Jennings
Zoe Cramond as Emma Mackey
 Alexandra Park as Courtney

Notes

Jessica Marais' departure
Jessica Marais, who plays Rachel Rafter, announced on 15 February 2011 that the fourth season will be her last season of Packed to the Rafters. Her final episode was announced to air sometime in June or July 2011, but new episodes had yet to air. The series returned 23 August 2011 with Marais' final episode. Marais' departure was due to her desire to head to the US in hopes of securing work during pilot season. Marais has filmed a few scenes via Skype for the last episode of Season 4.

Season Hiatuses
The Seven Network put Packed to the Rafters on hiatus from 15 March 2011 and was replaced by one of the networks new drama series, Winners & Losers. The series was expected to return in either June or July 2011, but new episodes had yet to air. The series returned 23 August 2011.

Packed to the Rafters again went on hiatus from 25 October 2011 and returned 14 February 2012 with a double episode.

Episodes

{| class="wikitable plainrowheaders" style="width:100%;"
|-style="color:black"
! style="background: #57AC30;" | No. inseries
! style="background: #57AC30;" | No. inseason
! style="background: #57AC30;" | Title
! style="background: #57AC30;" | Narrator
! style="background: #57AC30;" | Directed by
! style="background: #57AC30;" | Written by
! style="background: #57AC30;" | Original Air Date
! style="background: #57AC30;" | Australian Viewers(millions)
|-

|-style="color:black"
!colspan="8;" style="background-color: #57AC30;"| Part 2

|}

Reception

Ratings

1 Viewer numbers are based on preliminary OzTAM data for Sydney, Melbourne, Brisbane, Adelaide and Perth combined.

References

2011 Australian television seasons